Rowing has been contested at every Asian Games since its introduction to the program at the 1982 Asian Games.

Editions

Events

Medal table

List of medalists

References

External links 
Asian Rowing Federation

 
Sports at the Asian Games
Asian Games
Asian Games